The Death of Priam is an 1861 oil on canvas by Jules Lefebvre. He entered it for the Prix de Rome, which it won. It depicts Neoptolemus' murder of Priam as described in Virgil's Aeneid (Book II, lines 506–558) and is now in the collections of the École nationale supérieure des beaux-arts in Paris with the catalogue number PRP 111.

Exhibition history
USA, 1984-1985 : The Grand Prix de Rome, 1797-1863, National Academy of Design, New York, January–March 1984, The Virginia Museum of Fine Arts, Richmond, April–May 1984, Indianapolis Museum of Art, Indianapolis, July–August 1984, The Walter Art Gallery, Baltimore, September–October 1984, Phoenix Art Museum, Phoenix, November 1984-January 1985, The Society of the Four Arts, Palm Beach, February–March 1985, San Antonio Museum of Art, San Antonio, April–June 1985, New Orleans Museum of Art, New Orléans, July–September 1985.
Japan, 1989, The Prix de Rome for painting, Tokyo, Shoto Museum of Art
France, USA, 2004–2006, Gods and Mortals : Homeric Themes in the collections of the École nationale supérieure des beaux-arts de Paris : École nationale supérieure des beaux-arts, Paris, 21 September-28 November 2004, Princeton university art museum, Princeton, USA, 8 October 2005 – 15 January 2006, Dahesh museum, New York, USA, October 2005-January 2006.
France, 2012, La Dernière nuit de Troie, violence et classicisme dans l'art européen du XIX siecle, musée des beaux-arts d'Angers, 25 May-12 September 2012
China, 2014–2015, Chinese Museum of Art, Peking, 30 October 2014 - April 2015

References

Bibliography
 Philippe Grunchec, Le Grand Prix de peinture, les concours des prix de Rome de 1797 à 1863, preface by Jacques Thuillier. Paris, 1983, p. 316
 Catalogue, La Dernière nuit de Troie, violence et classicisme dans l'art européen du XIX siecle, Angers, musée des beaux-arts, exposition 25 mai-12 septembre 2012,  pp. 100–101

1861 paintings
Paintings in the collection of the Beaux-Arts de Paris
Paintings based on the Aeneid
Paintings about death